Rugodentus is a monotypic genus of scorpions belonging to the monotypic family Rugodentidae. The only species is Rugodentus keralaensis.

The species is found in Kerala, India.

References

Scorpions